Werner Henle (August 27, 1910 – July 6, 1987) and Gertrude Henle (April 3, 1912 – September 1, 2006) were a husband and wife team of virologists known for their work in flu vaccines and viral diagnostics. Together they authored more than 200 papers.

Gertrude Henle 
Gertrude Henle (born Szpingier, on April 3, 1912, in Mannheim, Germany; died age 94 on September 1, 2006, in Newtown Square, Pennsylvania) was an American virologist.

Henle came from a Protestant family of civil servants and grew up in Mannheim. Her mother was murdered by the Nazis in 1943; her father had died in 1938. Henle studied from 1931 medicine at the University of Heidelberg, and earned her medical degree in 1936.

For her doctorate, she was at the Kaiser Wilhelm Institute for Medical Research, where she met her husband Werner Henle, whom she followed to Philadelphia in 1937, in the U.S., where they married in 1937. Both worked in their careers closely related. She was from 1937 Instructor of Microbiology at the University of Pennsylvania, and from 1941 Associate Professor of Virology (and member of the Research Department of Virology at the Children's Hospital of Philadelphia). Later she became a professor. In 1982, she retired, the same year as her husband. Gertrude and Werner Henle are known for their work on flu vaccination and the development of a test for mumps known. They also reported the carcinogenic effects of the Epstein-Barr virus after and investigated further tumor viruses . They showed the effect of gamma with Joseph Stokes globulin against hepatitis . She has published mostly with her husband over 200 scientific papers.

In the 1980s they worked with AIDS.

In 1975 she was made an honorary Doctor of Pennsylvania College of Medicine.

She was a U.S. citizen since 1942.

Werner Henle 
Werner Henle was born August 27, 1910, in Dortmund, Germany and died July 6, 1987, in Bryn Mawr, Pennsylvania. He was a German-American virologist and partly Jewish by descent.

Henle was the son of the surgeon Adolf Henle and the grandson of Jacob Henle. He studied medicine and received his doctorate in Heidelberg. There he met his wife Gertrude Szpingier, also a graduate student physician. Both emigrated to the US in 1936 and married in 1937. The marriage remained childless.

Henle was in 1936 at the University of Pennsylvania and from 1939 at the same time at the Children's Hospital of Philadelphia worked. Together with his wife could Henle made some fundamental discoveries in the field of virus diagnostics.

Together with Dr. Joseph Stokes Jr., they showed the efficacy of gamma globulin against hepatitis infections. Finally, they worked successfully in the field of rapid diagnostics for mumps.

In the years 1962 and 1963 Henle served as president of the American Association of Immunologists.

Research
In 1968, they discovered how to immunize against the Epstein–Barr virus and confirmed a link between this virus and infectious mononucleosis.

Awards 
The Gold Medal of the Children's Hospital of Philadelphia (1983)
Bristol-Myers Award (1979)
William B. Coley Award (1975)
the Virus Cancer Program Award (1975)
Robert Koch Prize (1971)
E. Mead Johnson Award (1950)

References 

American virologists
German virologists
20th-century American physicians
Married couples